Los Naranjos may refer to:
Los Naranjos, Honduras
Los Naranjos, Chiriquí, Panama